Dagger Mouth is Swollen Members' sixth studio album, released on April 12, 2011 under Suburban Noize. The whole album only features one guest appearance which is made by Saigon.

Track listing

Charts

References

2011 albums
Swollen Members albums
Suburban Noize Records albums